Germán Gómez Gómez (Santander, Cantabria, 5 January 1914 – Madrid, 22 March 2004) was a Spanish professional footballer who played for Racing Santander and Atlético Madrid.

Playing career
Gómez joined Atlético (at that time known as (Athletic Aviación de Madrid) in 1939 from Racing, where he had played his first La Liga matches prior to the outbreak of the Spanish Civil War and a three-year interruption.

He spent eight seasons with Atléti, forming a formidable partnership with Machín and Ramón Gabilondo in the midfield. Under manager Ricardo Zamora, Gómez was able to win successive league titles and was club captain for most of his Madrid career.

After his successful spell at Atlético, Germán went back to Santander to play for Racing, retiring in 1954. He also had a stint as manager of Gimnástica de Torrelavega in his native region.

International career
Germán won 6 caps with the Spanish national team, making his debut in Valencia on 28 December 1941, in a 3–2 win against Switzerland.

Honours
Atlético Madrid
La Liga: 1939–40, 1940–41

References

External links
 
 
 

1914 births
2004 deaths
Footballers from Santander, Spain
Spanish footballers
Association football midfielders
La Liga players
Segunda División players
Tercera División players
Rayo Cantabria players
Atlético Madrid footballers
Racing de Santander players
Spain international footballers
Spanish football managers
Segunda División managers
Gimnástica de Torrelavega managers